The Real Hotel Company was a hotel firm which was founded in 1877 and went into administration in 2009.

History
The company was founded as the Birmingham Coffee House Company in 1877 and evolved through the early 20th century to become the Arden and Cobden Group, owning three Birmingham properties: the Arden Hotel, Cobden Hotel and Norfolk Hotel. In December 1985 the company was bought by Henry Edwards, an entrepreneur. In 1986, he floated the company under the name of Friendly Hotels PLC on the London Stock Exchange.

The company became a franchisee of Choice Hotels International (CHI), a US-based hotel group, in 1996. It rebranded its Friendly Hotels and Friendly Stop Inns with the Comfort Inn and Quality Hotel brand names. The relationship prospered and in 1996, the company gained the master franchise from CHI to develop the Choice brands in the UK and Ireland, followed, in 1998, by the master franchise to develop the Comfort, Quality, Clarion and Sleep Inn brands across Continental Europe (excluding Scandinavia).

In June 2001, CHI revealed that it was talking to several potential buyers about selling its stake in the company. In order to demonstrate synergy with CHI, the company changed its name from Friendly Hotels PLC to CHE Group PLC in August 2001. The talks with buyers ended in February 2002, and having failed to find a buyer, CHI simply wrote off its interest in the company.

In October 2007, the company announced the launch of its new brand, Purple Hotels, and changed the its to The Real Hotel Company.

However, the economic downturn hit the company hard, and it slid into losses in 2007. The company announced the suspension of the company's ordinary shares on the Alternative Investment Market on 13 January 2009. The company was placed into administration with Shay Bannon and Antony Nygate of BDO Stoy Hayward appointed as the administrators on 21 January 2009.

The final property disposed of was the Quality Hotel in Perth which was sold in February 2011.

References

External links
 New Connaught Rooms
 Focus Hotels

British companies established in 1877
Companies disestablished in 2009
Defunct hotel chains
Hotel chains in the United Kingdom